The Eagle Borax Works in Death Valley, California was established near Bennetts Well in 1882 by Isidore Daunet, J.M. McDonald, M. Harmon and C.C. Blanch to mine the borate deposits that Daunet discovered there in 1880. The partnership established the first borax works in the valley. Partly refined borax was hauled to Daggett, California through the Panamint Valley using 12-mule teams hauling two wagons. The extraction business operated until 1884 when problems mounted and Daunet killed himself. The property eventually passed to the U.S. Borax Company, which kept it as a mining reserve, then to Borax Consolidated, Ltd. in 1922. The property was sold to the Death Valley Hotel Company in 1956, and finally to the National Park Service.

Little remains of the structures but ruins. The works originally included a boiler, a tank for dissolved borax, and open tanks for crystallization of the borax. A stone building stood nearby to house the workers. The boiler fire box remains, along with an earth mound at the site of the building.

Isidore Daunet
Isidore Daunet (1850–1884) was a French emigrant to the United States, who arrived at the age of ten, coming to San Francisco and becoming a prospector at the age of 13. Daunet discovered the borax deposit during a disastrous 1880 crossing of Death Valley, in which three of his companions died, and Daunet survived only by killing one of the party's animals and drinking its blood. After establishing the borax company in 1882, he fell into business trouble. His wife gave notice of her intention to divorce him, and Daunet was swindled out of $11,000. He committed suicide in May 1884.

The site of the borax works was listed on the National Register of Historic Places on December 31, 1974. The site is within Death Valley National Park.

See also
 Harmony Borax Works, a more intact example of a borax works, also in Death Valley

References

Death Valley
Mining in California
Geography of Inyo County, California
Industrial buildings and structures on the National Register of Historic Places in California
Pre-statehood history of California
Protected areas of the Mojave Desert
Borax mines
Industrial buildings completed in 1882
Mines in California
Historic districts on the National Register of Historic Places in California
National Register of Historic Places in Inyo County, California
National Register of Historic Places in Death Valley National Park
1882 establishments in California